Zubov's method is a technique for computing the basin of attraction for a set of ordinary differential equations (a dynamical system). The domain of attraction is the set , where  is the solution to a partial differential equation known as the Zubov equation. Zubov's method can be used in a number of ways.

Statement

Zubov's theorem states that:

 for every  there exist  such that  , if 
 

If f is continuously differentiable, then the differential equation has at most one continuously differentiable solution satisfying .

References

Ordinary differential equations